The Salinas Valley is one of the major valleys and most productive agricultural regions in California. It is located west of the San Joaquin Valley and south of San Francisco Bay and the Santa Clara Valley.

The Salinas River, which geologically formed the fluvial valley and generated its human history, flows to the northwest or 'up' along the principal axis and the length of the valley.

The valley was named during the late 18th-century Spanish colonial Alta California period, and in Spanish Salina is the term for a salt marsh, salt lake, or salt pan. The seasonal Salinas River had brackish tule ponds in broad depressed areas, and more salinity during summer and when drought lowered flows.

The valley runs in a southeast to northwest alignment. It begins south of San Ardo, framed by the central inner California Coast Ranges, continues northwestward continuously defined on the west by the Santa Lucia Range, on the east by the Gabilan Range, to its end and the river's mouth at the Monterey Bay.

It is also known for being the setting of the novels East of Eden and Of Mice and Men, by John Steinbeck.

Geography 

The valley lends its name to the geologic province in which it is located, the Salinian Block. Cities and populated places in the Salinas Valley include Bradley, Castroville, Chualar, Gonzales, Greenfield, Jolon, King City, Salinas, San Ardo, San Lucas, Soledad and Spreckels. The Salinas Valley is located in between the Gabilan and Santa Lucia mountain ranges, which border the Salinas Valley to the east and the west, respectively.

History 
Before colonization, the valley was inhabited by indigenous Salinans who lived by hunting and gathering and spoke the Salinan language.

The Spanish colonial missions of San Miguel Arcángel, San Antonio de Padua and Nuestra Señora de la Soledad were all founded within the Salinas Valley in the late 18th century; from the last grew the city of Soledad.

The commercial farming sector of the Dust Bowl era forms the backdrop for several John Steinbeck stories including East of Eden, Tortilla Flat, Of Mice and Men, The Chrysanthemums, and Johnny Bear.

At a railroad crossing about one mile south of Chualar, a bus carrying Mexican migrant workers collided with a train in September 1963, killing 32 passengers and injuring 25. It was the most serious road accident in U.S. history, and helped spur abolition of the bracero program.

Agriculture 
Agriculture dominates the economy of the valley. Promoters call the Salinas Valley "the Salad Bowl of the World" for the production of lettuce, broccoli, peppers and numerous other crops. The climate and long growing season are also ideal for the flower industry and grape vineyards planted by world-famous vintners.

In particular, a large majority of the salad greens consumed in the U.S. are grown within this region. Strawberries, lettuce, tomatoes, and spinach are the dominant crops in the valley. Other crops include broccoli, cauliflower, wine grapes, artichokes, and celery. Due to the intensity of local agriculture, the area has earned itself the nickname "America's Salad Bowl." The flower industry, grown in greenhouses, is now dominated by Matsui Nursery, which has been a major philanthropic benefactor to Salinas.

Salinas Valley is also an important viticultural area. Three American Viticultural Association "American Viticultural Area" domains are located within Salinas Valley: the Arroyo Seco AVA, the Santa Lucia Highlands AVA, and the Monterey AVA.

Although agriculture forms an economic base, more than 100 manufacturing firms call Salinas home. Some of the largest employers in the area include: Dole Fresh Vegetable, the County of Monterey, and Salinas Valley Memorial Hospital.

Water 

Supplying Salinas Valley farms is an underground water supply fed, in part, by the large watershed in surrounding mountains. Two reservoirs – Nacimiento and San Antonio—store and release the water for groundwater recharge, flood control and farming. The Salinas River itself is a sand river, so water appears on the surface only during heavy rains or when water is released from the upstream reservoirs. Increasing demand for water near the mouth of the valley is pulling seawater under the coastal area. The Salinas Valley Water Project, now under construction by the Monterey County Water Resources Agency, will use an inflatable dam near Salinas to capture more water during wet periods. Monterey County Water Recycling Projects, a combination of the Castroville Seawater Intrusion Project and the Salinas Valley Reclamation Project, started delivering recycled water to fields near Castroville in 1998. The projects reduce pumping of groundwater and slow down seawater intrusion.

Climate 
The Salinas Valley's weather varies from north to south. Proximity to Monterey Bay and the cool coastal waters of the Pacific cools the northern part of the valley in summer, and keeps it relatively mild in winter. The southern portion of the valley has greater extremes of temperature, hotter in summer, and colder in winter.

In summer, inland heating draws the marine layer into the valley, with fog and low clouds near Monterey Bay, sometimes extending farther down the valley.

The climate is ideal for the numerous vineyards in the Santa Lucia Highlands, promoting growth of winetasting along the River Road Wine Trail.

Events held in Salinas
The California Rodeo Salinas, California International Airshow, the National Steinbeck Center, and the Steinbeck Festival are major attractions.

2007 Salmonella outbreak 
On August 30, 2007, 8,000 cartons of spinach (from Metz Fresh, a King City-based grower and shipper, Salinas Valley, California) were recalled after Salmonella was discovered on routine testing. The incident led to a call from some consumer advocates and lawmakers for greater oversight in food safety, even if 90% of the suspect vegetable did not reach the shelves.

References

External links 

 
Valleys of California
S01
Valleys of Monterey County, California
Valleys of San Luis Obispo County, California
Valleys of San Benito County, California
Agriculture in California
Regions of California